During the 1982–83 season, the Scottish football club :Hibernian F.C. was placed 7th in the :Scottish Premier Division. The team reached the third round of the :Scottish Cup.

Scottish Premier Division

Final League table

Scottish League Cup

Group stage

Group 3 Final Table

Scottish Cup

See also
List of Hibernian F.C. seasons

References

External links
Hibernian 1982/1983 results and fixtures, Soccerbase

Hibernian F.C. seasons
Hibernian